Balitora kwangsiensis is a species of hillstream loach found in Southeast Asia (southern China, Laos, and Vietnam).

References

Balitoridae
Freshwater fish of China
Fish of Laos
Fish of Vietnam
Fish described in 1930